Joseph CostelloReshawn Jones (born March 21, 1986) is an American professional basketball player for Santeros de Aguada of the Baloncesto Superior Nacional. He played college basketball at Texas A&M (2004–2008). Jones married his wife in 2012 and they have two children together.

Early years
Jones was born March 21, 1986 to D.C. Nealey and Betty Jones in Normangee, Texas.

As a sophomore, junior, and senior at Normangee High School, Jones was a first-team All-State pick.   Averaging 22.4 points and 15.1 rebounds in his senior year, Jones led his school to a 37-2 record, winning their final 23 games.  The team earned a trip to the Class A Division I championship game where Jones was named the most valuable player in the title game, with 21 points, 17 rebounds, and 5 blocked shots.   Jones was ranked as the Number 86 prospect in the country by HoopScoop and the 12th best post prospect by Rivals.Com.

Jones was recruited by Kansas, Texas, University of Arkansas, and Texas Tech, but signed a National Letter of Intent to play at Texas A&M University under coach Melvin Watkins.

College career

Freshman year
Before Jones arrived in College Station, Aggies coach Melvin Watkins was forced out, with former University of Texas El Paso coach Billy Gillispie taking over the program.  Jones chose to honor his commitment and made an immediate impact at A&M, scoring 10 points and making 10 rebounds in his college debut against North Carolina AT&T University.  Jones, who started in all 31 games, ranked second on the team in scoring with 12.7 points per game and dunks (18) and led the Aggies in rebounding (7.3), field goal percentage (.577), blocked shots (39), and three-point plays (16).  He posted seven double-doubles, the most by a Big 12 freshman, and scored 10 or more points 23 times, also setting the A&M freshman record by completing 103 free throws.  His performance earned him honorable mention All-Big 12 honors and a place on the Big-12 All-Freshman team, with CollegeInsider.Com also naming him to their Freshman All-America team.

With a then-career-high twenty-five points, Jones led the Aggies to a win against Clemson in the first round of the NIT.

Sophomore year
As a sophomore, Jones started in all of the team's games, averaging 15.3 points and a team-best 6.5 rebounds.  In one of his most impressive games of the season, Jones scored 31 points against the University of Texas, the most points an Aggie had scored in Austin since 1963.  In that game he tied two Big 12 records, one for field goals in a half, making 9 of 11 second-half field goal attempts, as well as for most consecutive shots, making nine straight shots to end the game.  Jones also made the game-winning shot against Oklahoma State, completing an 8-foot jumper with one second remaining.  The Aggies lost their rematch against Oklahoma State despite Jones's 27 points.  Against North Texas, Jones scored a career-high 35 points and had a career-high 13 rebounds.

Jones ranked in the conference's top 10 in scoring and rebounding, despite averaging fewer than 30 minutes per game.  His performance earned him consensus second-team All-Big 12 honors, and he was named to the second-team Academic All-Big 12.

The Aggies earned a spot in the NCAA Tournament for the first time since 1987.  The Aggies won their first-round match-up against Syracuse and appeared poised to reach the Sweet 16 when, with 18 seconds left in their second-round game against LSU, the Aggies went up 57-55.  The dream was dashed fifteen seconds later, however, when Glen Davis completed a three-point shot for LSU.

Junior year
Expectations were raised for Jones's junior season, when Jones, along with teammate Acie Law IV, was named to the John R. Wooden pre-season top 50 All-American watch list, and the team received a Number 13 rank in the pre-season AP poll,  The Aggies have ranked as high as Number 6, the highest rank the school had ever achieved.  The team had their best start since opening 16-2 in the 1959-1960 season, as well as their best conference opening since the inception of the Big 12.

After suffering knee problems throughout non-conference play, Jones has been a big part of the  Aggies' successful 2006-2007 season, averaging 13.2 points per game and a team-best 6.4 rebounds per game.  Despite a cramp in his calf that kept him out of most of the second half of the game against Iowa State, Jones still scored 21 points.  Jones is an aggressive player, however, and also leads the team in fouls, averaging 3.4 per game and fouling out of five games.

The Aggies have been consistently ranked in the top 10 throughout this season.  In a historic moment on February 3, 2007, Jones's Aggies became the first Big 12 South team (in 32 attempts) to ever beat the then-Number 6 Kansas Jayhawks at Allen Fieldhouse. Two days later the team earned a 100-82 victory over their archrivals, then-Number 25 Texas, their twenty-first straight home win, making them the sole leader of the Big 12.

Although the Aggies were the number two seed for the Big 12 Conference Tournament, they played poorly in their first game in the quarterfinals of the tournament and were eliminated in a loss to Oklahoma State.

On Selection Sunday, however, the Aggies were rewarded for their regular-season play with a Number 3 seed in the South region of the 2007 NCAA Tournament.  In their first-round game against Penn,  Jones finished with a double-double, 14 points and 11 rebounds.  He energized the team in the second half, scoring two dunks in less than a minute to give the Aggies the lead.  The Aggies won 68-52 to advance to the second round of the tournament.

In front of an unfriendly crowd during a tough second-round game against Louisville, Jones scored twelve points and had eight rebounds and three steals.   The Aggies's 72-69 victory earned them a berth in the Sweet 16 for the first time since 1980.

Senior year
Jones, along with Texas Longhorns player D. J. Augustin, was featured on the front cover of the November 15, 2007 issue of Sports Illustrated. Jones graduated from A&M a semester early.

Professional career
After his college career, Jones joined the Houston Rockets 2008 Summer League. The team had a 12-man roster and was coached by Rockets assistant coach Elston Turner. The team played five games against other NBA teams from July 14–20, 2008.

In the season 2008-09 has been playing at Oyak Renaul Bursa in the Turkish Basketball League. He's averaged 32.2 minutes and 13.9 points per game being the second top-scorer of the team during this season.

In 2012, after spending two years in France with STB Le Havre and one year in Israel with Hapoel Gilboa Galil, Jones signs with Spanish squad CAI Zaragoza.

In September 2014, Jones signed with Hapoel Jerusalem of Israel.

On October 19, 2016, Jones signed with Azad University Tehran. On February 21, 2017, he moved to French club Limoges CSP.

References

External links
Eurobasket.com Profile
RealGM.com Profile

1986 births
Living people
African-American basketball players
American expatriate basketball people in the Dominican Republic
American expatriate basketball people in France
American expatriate basketball people in Iran
American expatriate basketball people in Israel
American expatriate basketball people in Spain
American expatriate basketball people in Turkey
American men's basketball players
Basket Zaragoza players
Basketball players from Texas
Cangrejeros de Santurce basketball players
CB Canarias players
Centers (basketball)
Hapoel Gilboa Galil Elyon players
Hapoel Jerusalem B.C. players
Liga ACB players
Limoges CSP players
Oyak Renault basketball players
People from Leon County, Texas
People from Madison County, Texas
STB Le Havre players
Texas A&M Aggies men's basketball players
21st-century African-American sportspeople
20th-century African-American people